The 2012 Finnish Athletics Championships was the 105th edition of the national outdoor track and field championships for Finland. It took place from 23 to 26 August 2012 at Lahti Stadium in Lahti.

Results

Men

Women

References

Jalava, Mirko (2012-08-27). Ruuskanen improves to 87.79m in Lahti – Finnish champs. Retrieved 2019-06-23.
NC Lahti FIN 23 - 26 August 2012 / Kalevan Kisat, National Championships. Tilastopaja (2012-11-11). Retrieved 2019-06-23.

Finnish Athletics Championships
Finnish Athletics Championships
Finnish Athletics Championships
Finnish Athletics Championships
Sport in Lahti